Lola Rodríguez may refer to:

 Lola Rodríguez (actress) (born 1998), Spanish actress and model
 Lola Rodríguez de Tió (1843–1924), Puerto Rican poet